Jax is the stage name of Jackson McGoldrick, an American drag queen, dancer and photographer best known for competing on the season 15 of RuPaul's Drag Race, where she placed 10th place.

Early years 
McGoldrick was born in Puerto Rico and raised in Darien, Connecticut. He participated in gymnastics and competitive cheerleading. He attended the School of Visual Arts, where he graduated with a Bachelor of Fine Arts degree in photography and videography.

Career 
McGoldrick started drag as a way to make satirical comments about his upbringing in suburban Connecticut. He used to form photographs of conversations he overheard in his hometown and create amplified impersonations for him to place in front of the camera. His first drag performance was at a bar near her home called Icon in New York City, where she lip-synced to "My Way" by Noah Cyrus.

On December 13, 2022, Jax was announced as one of the 16 contestants who would compete in season 15 of RuPaul's Drag Race. During her time on the show, she placed among the top positions in the first episode. She placed in the bottom twice, eliminating Robin Fierce and Aura Mayari in lip sync. She was later eliminated in episode 8 after losing in the LipSync Lalaparuza Smackdown against Anetra, finishing in 10th place.

Personal  life 
McGoldrick lives in Queens and has been dating her boyfriend Patrick since 2020.

Jax uses she/they pronouns when in drag.

Filmography

Television

Web series

Notes

References

External links 
 

Living people
American drag queens
Gay entertainers
LGBT people from Connecticut
People from Darien, Connecticut
Puerto Rican drag queens
Jax
School of Visual Arts alumni